Max Siollun is a Nigerian historian who specializes on Nigerian history with a particular focus on the Nigerian military and how it has affected Nigeria's socio-political trajectory from the pre-colonial era to the present. Siollun was educated in England, graduating from the University of London.

Articles and books 

Siollun's book Oil, Politics and Violence: Nigeria's Military Coup Culture (1966–1976), published in 2009, has received favorable reviews by numerous commentators who note Siollun's contribution to Nigerian history, not least for its dispassionate tone, critical insight and unpacking of a complex series of events which were hitherto poorly documented or not documented at all.

Siollun has written about the infamous Dikko Affair, which strained diplomatic relations between Great Britain and Nigeria for some time. Siollun's fourth book What Britain Did to Nigeria: A Short History of Conquest and Rule was published in 2021.

Bibliography
 
 
 Nigeria's Soldiers of Fortune: The Abacha and Obasanjo Years, Oxford University Press, 2019.
 What Britain Did to Nigeria: A Short History of Conquest and Rule, C. Hurst & Co Publishers, 2021. .

References 

21st-century Nigerian historians
Living people
Alumni of the University of London
Historians of Nigeria
Year of birth missing (living people)